Ransom County is a county in the U.S. state of North Dakota. As of the 2020 census, the population was 5,703. Its county seat is Lisbon.

History
The Dakota Territory legislature created Ransom County on January 4, 1873. It was so named due to its military fort, which had been named Fort Ransom for Civil War veteran Major General Thomas E.G. Ransom. The fort had operated between 1867 and 1872. The county was not organized at that time, nor was it attached to another county for administrative or judicial purposes. Its proposed boundaries were altered two times during 1881. On April 4, 1881, the county government was effected. The county's area was again reduced in 1883 when Sargent County was created. Ransom County has retained its present configuration since that time.

Geography
The Sheyenne River meanders through Ransom County. The county terrain consists of rolling hills, dotted with lakes and ponds in its western part. The area is largely devoted to agriculture. The terrain slopes to the east and south; its highest point is on the north boundary line near its northwestern corner, at 1,421' (433m) ASL.

Major highways
  North Dakota Route 27
  North Dakota Route 32
  North Dakota Route 46

Adjacent counties

 Cass County - northeast
 Richland County - east
 Sargent County - south
 Dickey County - southwest
 LaMoure County - west
 Barnes County - northwest

Protected areas

 Browns Ranch
 Fort Ransom State Historic Site
 Fort Ransom State Park
 Nature Conservancy's Sheyenne Delta
 North Country Trail
 Pigeon Point Reserve
 Sheyenne National Grassland (part)
 Sheyenne State Forest

Lakes
 Lone Tree Lake

Demographics

2000 census
As of the 2000 census, there were 5,890 people, 2,350 households, and 1,560 families in the county. The population density was 6.83/sqmi (2.64/km2). There were 2,604 housing units at an average density of 3.02/sqmi (1.17/km2). The racial makeup of the county was 97.93% White, 0.19% Black or African American, 0.32% Native American, 0.25% Asian, 0.37% from other races, and 0.93% from two or more races. 0.81% of the population were Hispanic or Latino of any race. 39.5% were of German and 34.9% Norwegian ancestry.

There were 2,350 households, out of which 31.00% had children under the age of 18 living with them, 58.10% were married couples living together, 5.10% had a female householder with no husband present, and 33.60% were non-families. 30.70% of all households were made up of individuals, and 15.50% had someone living alone who was 65 years of age or older.  The average household size was 2.39 and the average family size was 3.01.

The county population contained 25.00% under the age of 18, 5.90% from 18 to 24, 25.40% from 25 to 44, 22.40% from 45 to 64, and 21.20% who were 65 years of age or older. The median age was 41 years. For every 100 females there were 106.20 males. For every 100 females age 18 and over, there were 105.80 males.

The median income for a household in the county was $37,672, and the median income for a family was $44,865. Males had a median income of $35,023 versus $18,772 for females. The per capita income for the county was $18,219. About 6.30% of families and 8.80% of the population were below the poverty line, including 10.70% of those under age 18 and 8.20% of those age 65 or over.

2010 census
As of the 2010 census, there were 5,457 people, 2,310 households, and 1,466 families in the county. The population density was 6.33/sqmi (2.44/km2). There were 2,656 housing units at an average density of 3.08/sqmi (1.19/km2). The racial makeup of the county was 97.8% white, 0.4% Asian, 0.4% American Indian, 0.3% black or African American, 0.1% Pacific islander, 0.1% from other races, and 0.9% from two or more races. Those of Hispanic or Latino origin made up 1.2% of the population. In terms of ancestry, 54.2% were German, 36.6% were Norwegian, 9.0% were Irish, 6.9% were Swedish, 5.1% were English, and 1.6% were American.

Of the 2,310 households, 27.8% had children under the age of 18 living with them, 54.8% were married couples living together, 5.4% had a female householder with no husband present, 36.5% were non-families, and 32.9% of all households were made up of individuals. The average household size was 2.28 and the average family size was 2.89. The median age was 45.2 years.

The median income for a household in the county was $46,044 and the median income for a family was $59,973. Males had a median income of $42,380 versus $28,209 for females. The per capita income for the county was $21,995. About 7.5% of families and 9.4% of the population were below the poverty line, including 13.2% of those under age 18 and 11.6% of those age 65 or over.

Communities

Cities

 Elliott
 Enderlin (partly in Cass County)
 Fort Ransom
 Lisbon (county seat)
 Sheldon

Census-designated places
 Englevale
 McLeod

Townships

 Aliceton
 Alleghany
 Bale
 Big Bend
 Casey
 Coburn
 Elliott
 Fort Ransom
 Greene
 Hanson
 Island Park
 Isley
 Liberty
 McLeod
 Moore
 Northland
 Owego
 Preston
 Rosemeade
 Sandoun
 Scoville
 Shenford
 Springer
 Sydna
 Tuller

Politics
Ransom County is a swing county in presidential elections, having voted for both parties an equal number of times since 1980. It voted for the Democrat in the 2000 and 2012 gubernatorial elections, and for the Republican in 2004, 2008, and 2016.

Ransom County is one of the most Democratic counties in North Dakota. In the 2018 election for U.S. Senate, it gave Heidi Heitkamp her 4th-highest total (60.6%), behind only Sioux, Rolette, and Benson counties.

Education
School districts include:
 Enderlin Area Public School District 24
 Fort Ransom Public School District 6
 Kindred Public School District 2
 LaMoure Public School District 8
 Litchville-Marion Public School District 46
 Lisbon Public School District 19
 Milnor Public School District 2
 North Sargent Public School District 3
 Oakes Public School District 41
 Wyndmere Public School District 42

In 1905 it had 22 school districts, with 16 not having a bond. Circa 1905 the county had 2,431 students in its three high schools, five grade schools, and 75 schoolhouses.

See also
 National Register of Historic Places listings in Ransom County ND

References

External links
 Ransom County map, North Dakota DOT

 
1881 establishments in Dakota Territory
Populated places established in 1881